Farlow Gap is a popular trail for mountain biking and hiking, located in the western area of North Carolina. It is an expert-level trail, and considered "one of the toughest mountain bike trails in Pisgah National Forest."

Description 
Nearly the entire trail is singletrack, and starts with a relatively flat section but quickly becomes fall line into a rock garden. It has been described as "brutal" and is one of the steepest and rockiest downhill trails in Pisgah National Forest. Many people ride to the left or right of the rock garden, or dismount and walk on one side of it. After the early steep sections, the remainder of the trail includes some short uphill sections, other rocky areas, occasional drops, and other technical sections. The trail also crosses several small creeks, including Shuck Ridge Creek, and one fork of the Davidson River.

Farlow Gap is usually ridden as part of a loop. A short section of this route runs parallel to, and twice crosses the Art Loeb Trail, shortly before arriving at the starting point of Farlow Gap. After completing the Farlow Gap section, the trail links with Daniel Ridge Trail, which can be taken in one of two directions. Both directions feature more flowy technical riding, both of which return to the start point. A separate short ride from the Daniel Ridge Trail can be taken to see Toms Spring Falls.

Other activities 
This trail is used mainly by mountain bikers, but can be equally enjoyed by hikers. Due to the steepness of many sections, horseback riding, and sled-dogging is prohibited. Challenges for hikers include a long strenuous climb when hiking the trail as a loop, rocky sections, and crossing small creeks. Trail rules require mountain bikers to yield to hikers; nevertheless, hikers should be watchful of mountain bike traffic. Mountain bike races sometimes include Farlow Gap as a section of the race, and hikers should either avoid the trail on these days, or be especially watchful. The trail crosses several creeks where water bottles can be filled.

Animals, plants, and geology 
There is a variety of birds, reptiles and mammals in the area. Deer, rabbits and bobcats may be spotted by watchful hikers and mountain bikers. Farlow Gap and the Daniel Ridge Trail pass through forests with diverse tree species, including yellow poplar, red oak, black gum, and red maple. Rhododendron also grows abundantly (sometimes called laurel), and remains green all year, its leaves curling in the winter.

History 
The early history of Farlow Gap trail is unclear. Geological documents from the 1940s identify a small mica mine located on the trail. Small flakes of the shiny mineral are often seen alongside the trail. The site has also been  alternately identified as "Furlow Gap" or "Furlough Gap" in old historical records.

Photo gallery

See also 
Hiking
Mountain biking
Downhill mountain biking
Mountain bike
Downhill bike
Enduro (mountain biking)
Glossary of cycling

Notes

References

External links
 Brevardnc.com (Insiders guide to Transylvania County, including information about mountain biking in Pisgah National Forest).

Pisgah National Forest
Mountain biking
Hiking trails in North Carolina